Mustapha Adnane (1931 – 28 April 2006) was a Moroccan weightlifter. He competed in the 1960 and 1964 Summer Olympics.

References

1931 births
2006 deaths
Weightlifters at the 1960 Summer Olympics
Weightlifters at the 1964 Summer Olympics
Moroccan male weightlifters
Olympic weightlifters of Morocco
Sportspeople from Casablanca
20th-century Moroccan people
21st-century Moroccan people